Eloise Baza (January 5, 1953 – October 29, 2007) was the president of the Guam Chamber of Commerce from 1984 until 2007. She was the first woman and the first Chamorro to hold the presidency of the Chamber of Commerce. She was also the longest-serving president of the organization to date.

Early life
Baza was born on January 5, 1953, to her parents Jose Camacho Baza and Rosa Rivera Baza. Baza was a 1974 graduate of the College of Notre Dame, which is now known as the Notre Dame de Namur University, in Belmont, California. She was also a student at Boston College.

Guam Chamber of Commerce
Baza began working for the Guam Department of Commerce from 1976 to 1981 as chief of the Economic development Planning and Financing Division.
She left the department to work as an assistant for then-president of the Guam Chamber of Commerce, Jim McDonald, for three years. Baza became president of the Chamber in 1984 when McDonald stepped down.  She was the first woman to head the organization. She remained president until her death in 2007.

Baza became active in the Guamanian community during her tenure. She was particularly interested in drug prevention programs. Among her many achievements was the creation of Guam's Juvenile and Adult Drug court Programs. She co-founded the program with Guam Judge Elizabeth Barrett-Anderson. Most recently, Baza was involved in Guam's Red Ribbon week in September 2007.

Baza was also considered an instrumental figure in the creation of the Guam Business Hall of Fame in 1992.

Death
Eloise Baza died on October 29, 2007, at Guam Memorial Hospital of cardiac arrest. She was 54 years old. Her funeral was held at St. Jude Catholic Church in Sinajana. She was buried at Our Lady of Peace Memorial Gardens in Yona, Guam.

Guam's Delegate to the United States House of Representatives Madeleine Bordallo issued a statement in response to Baza's death: "Eloise was a driving force behind the Chamber and her leadership gave the
Chamber an important voice in our community. She played a central role in
the Chamber's advocacy of sound economic policy, government reform and
community service."

References

External links
 Guam Chamber of Commerce
 Congresswoman Bordallo Mourns Chamber President Eloise Baza
 Pacific Daily News: Baza laid to rest
 Pacific News Center: Family, Friends, Business Leaders Say Final Goodbyes To Eloise Baza

1953 births
2007 deaths
Chamorro people
Guamanian businesspeople
Boston College alumni
Guamanian Roman Catholics
American women in business
Notre Dame de Namur University alumni
People from Hagåtña, Guam
20th-century American businesswomen
20th-century American businesspeople
21st-century American businesswomen
21st-century American businesspeople